Kara-Saz is a village, center of Kosh-Döbö rural community of Kochkor District of Naryn Region, Kyrgyzstan. Its population was 1,743 in 2021.

References
 

Populated places in Naryn Region